United Nations Security Council Resolution 351, adopted on June 10, 1974, after examining the application of the People's Republic of Bangladesh for membership in the United Nations, the Council recommended to the General Assembly that the People's Republic of Bangladesh be admitted.

The resolution was adopted without vote.

See also
 List of United Nations Security Council Resolutions 301 to 400 (1971–1976)

References
Text of the Resolution at undocs.org

External links
 

 0351
 0351
 0351
1974 in Bangladesh
June 1974 events